Vauthier is a surname. Notable people with the surname include:

Alexandre Vauthier (born 1971), French fashion designer
Antoine-Charles Vauthier (1790–1879), French botanist
Arsène Marie Paul Vauthier (1885–1979), major general in the French Army
Eugène Vauthier (1843–1910), French opera singer
Jean Vauthier (1910–1992), French playwright
Louis Constant Vauthier (1887-1963), Swiss internationalist physician 
Louis-Léger Vauthier (1815–1901), French engineer and politician
Marcel Vauthier (1910–1988), French politician
Paul Moreau-Vauthier (1871–1936), French sculptor